The Church Rock uranium mill spill occurred in the U.S. state of New Mexico on July 16, 1979, when United Nuclear Corporation's tailings disposal pond at its uranium mill in Church Rock breached its dam. The accident remains the largest release of radioactive material in U.S. history, having released more radioactivity than the Three Mile Island accident four months earlier.

The milling of uranium ore produced an acidic slurry of ground waste rock and fluid (tailings) that was pumped to the tailings disposal area. In addition to being radioactive and acidic, the spill contained toxic metals and sulfates. The spill contaminated groundwater and rendered the Puerco unusable to local residents, mostly Navajo peoples who used the river's water for drinking, irrigation, and livestock. They were not warned for days of the toxic dangers from the spill.

The Governor of New Mexico Bruce King refused the Navajo Nation's request that the site be declared a federal disaster area, limiting aid to affected residents. The nuclear contamination event received less media coverage than that of Three Mile Island, possibly because it occurred in a very rural area not served by major media. The spill also happened in Native American country, among a community that at that time were not predisposed to speaking out.

In 2003, the Churchrock Chapter of the Navajo Nation began the Church Rock Uranium Monitoring Project to assess environmental impacts of abandoned uranium mines; it found significant radiation from both natural and mining sources in the area. The EPA National Priorities List currently includes the Church Rock tailings storage site, where "groundwater migration is not under control."

Dam failure
Warnings of an impending spill had been ignored by the state and by United Nuclear Corporation. Though the uranium mill only bordered the Navajo Nation, the tailings spilled onto the Navajo Nation as they flowed down the Puerco River.

In addition to radioactive uranium, thorium, radium and polonium, it also contained various other metals, including cadmium, aluminium, magnesium, manganese, molybdenum, nickel, selenium, sodium, vanadium, zinc, iron, and lead, and also high concentrations of sulfates. The flood backed up sewers, affected nearby aquifers, and left stagnating, contaminated pools on the riverside.

As the highly acidic spill traveled downstream, alkaline soils and clays neutralized the acid and adsorbed many of the contaminants. The contaminated sediments were gradually dispersed by the river and diluted by “clean” sediment. In parts of the river system with higher concentrations of contaminants, yellow salt crystals precipitated onto the arroyo bed. These salts, containing metals and radionuclides, were washed away during subsequent rainstorms. Approximately one month after the spill, the Puerco River had regained normal levels of salinity, acidity, and radioactivity at low flow levels, with contaminants being detectable only after heavy rains. The EPA reported no long-term effects of the spill, but noted that contaminant levels from uranium mine effluents and natural sources were “environmentally significant”.

Response
At 6:00 am, a United Nuclear Corporation employee noticed the breach and suspended further discharge of tailings solution to the holding pond. By 8:00, a temporary dike had stopped the flow of residual tailings solution.

Several days after the spill, the Indian Health Service and the Environmental Improvement Division of New Mexico warned local residents over the radio and with signs written only in English not to drink from, water livestock at, or enter the Puerco River. Many Navajo people in the area speak only Diné, an Athabaskan language spoken by 150,000 people on the Navajo Nation.

The states of Arizona and New Mexico failed to make their residents immediately aware of the dangers of radiation. United Nuclear Corporation employees were dispatched to warn Navajo-speaking residents downstream in accordance with a state contingency plan, but not until a few days after the spill. The Navajo Nation asked the governor of New Mexico, Bruce King, to request disaster assistance from the US government and have the site declared a disaster area, but he refused, an action that limited disaster relief assistance to the Navajo Nation.

Although the New Mexico Environmental Improvement Division said the spill's "short-term and long-term impacts on people and the environment were quite limited", ponds of uranium-contaminated water lined the Puerco River and seeped into wells. United Nuclear denied claims that the spill caused livestock deaths, even though the Navajo economy, which was dependent on the sale of mutton was harmed. The company said in a statement issued by an attorney, "We just don't know of any substance to those claims. Some people aren't going to be satisfied no matter how thoroughly you show it." Navajo Tribal Council's vice president Frank Paul said of the worst spill in US history, "Somehow, United Nuclear Corporation was permitted to locate a tailings pond and a dam on an unstable geologic formation. Somehow, UNC was allowed to design an unsafe tailings dam not in conformance to its own design criteria. Somehow, UNC was permitted to inadequately deal with warning cracks that had appeared over two years prior to the date the dam failed. Somehow, UNC was permitted to continue a temporary dam for six months beyond its design life. Somehow, UNC was permitted to have a tailings dam without either an adequate contingency plan or sufficient men and material in place to deal with a spill. Somehow, UNC was permitted to deal with the spill by doing almost nothing."

Under the "agreement state" legislative framework of the Uranium Mill Tailings Radiation Control Act, the Nuclear Regulatory Commission left New Mexico to handle the dam failure until October 12, 1979, when it was notified that the state would permit the uranium mill to resume operation that week. The NRC then suspended United Nuclear's operating license until it could be determined that the embankment was stable. After fewer than four months of downtime following the dam failure, the mill resumed operations on November 2, 1979. This resumption further contaminated the groundwater and resulted in the mill site's placement on the EPA's National Priorities List in 1983. United Nuclear made a $525,000 out-of-court settlement with the Navajo Nation a year after the spill.

The accident released more radioactivity than the Three Mile Island accident. The spill has been called "the largest radioactive accident in U.S. history," but the Nuclear Regulatory Commission has said that this is "an overstatement," and that "there have been a number of other events that have been more significant in terms of radiological impact. The event was more significant from an environmental perspective than from a human one." Nevertheless, the incident remains the "largest single release" of radioactive materials into the environment in US history as of October 2020.

Causes

The dam formed the southern wall of one of the mill's three holding ponds, which were used to evaporate tailings solution until the remaining solid waste could be buried. United Nuclear used a new design, recommended by the Nuclear Regulatory Commission, that used earth rather than tailings themselves as building material. The holding pond was not lined, a violation of the Uranium Mill Tailings Radiation Control Act of 1978. This allowed tailings solution to seep into the ground, weakening the foundation of the dam and contaminating the groundwater.

Horizontal and vertical cracks formed along the southern part of the embankment, allowing the acidic tailings solution to penetrate and weaken the embankment. A sand beach was constructed to protect the face of the embankment from the tailings solution, but it was not properly maintained. The liquid in the holding pond eventually rose  higher than the dam's designed limit, past the point where the sand beach could protect the dam. The United States Army Corps of Engineers concluded in its report to Governor Bruce King of New Mexico that the principal cause of failure was differential settlement of the foundation beneath the dam wall, and the report commissioned by the Nuclear Regulatory Commission corroborated this conclusion. Critical variations in tailings pond operation practice from approved procedures contributed further to the dam failure. United Nuclear's Chief Operating Officer, J. David Hann, blamed the failure of dam on the pointed shape of the bedrock beneath the embankment, which he said acted as a fulcrum and weakened the dam.

In December 1977, independent consultants spotted cracks in the dam wall. Three months later, United Nuclear sealed the cracks with bentonite and kerosene slurry but took little or no other action, despite the consultant's urging for regular inspections of the dam. Further cracking was noted in October 1978. Neither the facility owner nor the State Engineer were formally notified of the cracks, though Arizona representative Morris K. Udall testified before Congress that at least three federal and state agencies had "ample opportunity" to predict that the dam's failure was likely. At the same Congressional hearing, the United States Army Corps of Engineers testified that had the dam been built according to legal specifications, the failure would not have occurred.

Effects

Shortly after the breach, below the dam radioactivity levels of river water were 7000 times that of the allowable level of drinking water. United Nuclear initially claimed that only one curie of radioactivity had been released in the spill, but that figure was later revised upward by the New Mexico Environmental Improvement Division. In all,  of radioactivity were released.

Prior to the spill, local residents used the riverside for recreation and herb-gathering, and children often waded in the Puerco River. Residents who waded in the river after the spill went to the hospital complaining of burning feet and were misdiagnosed with heat stroke. Burns acquired by some of those who came into contact with the contaminated water developed serious infections and required amputations. Herds of sheep and cattle died after drinking the contaminated water, and children played in pools of contaminated water. The spill contaminated shallow aquifers near the river that residents drank and used to water livestock. 1,700 people lost access to clean water after the spill. The three community wells serving Church Rock had already been closed, one because of high radium levels and the other two for high levels of iron and bacteria. The Indian Health Service advised the tribe to repair five shallow wells along the Puerco River and said that the wells "are not expected to show any contamination, if at all, for several years." The Navajo Nation spent $100,000 on clean water, and in 1981, the New Mexico and federal governments stopped providing water, which they had delivered by truck since the spill.

An epidemiological study conducted by the NMEID in 1989 concluded that "the health risk to the public from eating exposed cattle is minimal, unless large amounts of this tissue, especially liver and kidney, are ingested." An Indian Health Service study found significantly higher levels of radionuclides in Church Rock cattle compared to livestock from non-mining areas. The study's authors advised that contamination would not pose a risk as long as residents did not depend on livestock for food over long periods of time, but local Navajos did. A few Navajo children were sent to Los Alamos to be checked for radiation exposure, but no long-term monitoring was undertaken, prompting a local writer to comment that the IHS spent more effort studying livestock than the people affected. No ongoing epidemiological studies have been done at Church Rock. Studies have shown since the 1950s that the Navajo have had significantly higher rates for some cancers than the national average, associated with contamination from the uranium mines and the exposure of workers to radiation.

Cleanup
United Nuclear dispatched small crews with shovels and  drums to begin cleanup, but expanded the workforce after complaints from local residents and pressure from the state. Groundwater remained contaminated by the spilled tailings solution, and rain transported leftover pollutants downstream into Arizona. New Mexico ordered United Nuclear to monitor pools left behind by the spill along the Puerco River, but United Nuclear measured only uranium levels, ignoring the presence of 230Th and 226Ra. The pools contained high levels of sulfuric acid and remained for more than a month after the spill, despite cleanup efforts by the New Mexico Environmental Improvement Division. The NMEID ordered United Nuclear to control tailings seepage from the mill in 1979, and the company implemented a limited seepage collective program in 1981.

The Navajo Nation appealed to the governor to request that the president declare the site a federal disaster area, but he refused, reducing the aid available to local residents. United Nuclear continued operation of the uranium mill until 1982, when it closed because of the declining uranium market.

United Nuclear neutralized the acidity of the tailings with ammonia and lime from 1979 to 1982. In 1983, the site was entered on the National Priorities List of the Environmental Protection Agency's Superfund investigations and cleanup efforts, as radionuclides and chemical constituents were found to be contaminating local groundwater. The EPA conducted a remedial investigation from 1984 to 1987, and in the NRC approved United Nuclear's closure and reclamation plan in 1988.

In 1994 the EPA extended its efforts with a study of all known uranium mines on the Navajo Nation. The EPA and United Nuclear removed  of radium-contaminated soil surrounding five buildings, some residential, in 2007. The soil was moved to an off-site disposal facility.

In 2003 the Churchrock Chapter of the Navajo Nation began the Church Rock Uranium Monitoring Project to assess environmental impacts of abandoned uranium mines, and build capacity to conduct community-based research with policy implications. Its May 2007 report found radiation many times higher than background levels remaining in the area, from both natural and mining sources.

In 2008, the US Congress authorized a five-year plan for cleanup of contaminated uranium sites on the Navajo reservation.

See also
Uranium mining and the Navajo people
The Return of Navajo Boy
The Navajo People and Uranium Mining
Sequoyah Fuels Corporation
Environmental racism

References

Further reading

Christopher McLeod "Four Corners: A National Sacrifice Area?" bullfrogfilms.com
J. S. Smith, Jr., and J. H. Fisher, "Three Mile Island: The Silent Disaster," J. Amer. Med. Assoc. 245, 1656 (1981)

External links

 The Energy Library: "United Nuclear Corporation Superfund Site"
 The Return of Navajo Boy Webisodes: Clean-up of uranium contamination at Navajo Reservation

Radiation accidents and incidents
Radioactively contaminated areas
Tailings dam failures
Uranium mining on the Navajo Nation
Nuclear accidents and incidents in the United States
Nuclear history of the United States
Water pollution in the United States
Superfund sites in New Mexico
History of McKinley County, New Mexico
Mining in New Mexico
1979 industrial disasters
1979 in New Mexico
1979 in the environment
1979 disasters in the United States
Dam failures in the United States